Nicholas Mark Naitanui (born 4 May 1990) is an Australian rules footballer who plays for the West Coast Eagles in the Australian Football League (AFL). He was born in Sydney to Fijian parents, and his family moved to Perth, Western Australia after his father's death. Growing up in Midvale, Naitanui attended Governor Stirling Senior High School, and played football for the Midvale Junior Football Club. After representing Western Australia in the 2007 and 2008 AFL Under 18 Championships, he debuted in 2008 for the Swan Districts Football Club in the West Australian Football League (WAFL). Naitanui was drafted by West Coast with the second pick in the 2008 National Draft.

Naitanui made his AFL debut for West Coast in round 12 of the 2009 season, against . He played ten games in his debut season, and received one Brownlow Medal vote for a three-goal game against . In his second season, Naitanui played every game, primarily as a back-up ruckman to Dean Cox, taking over the position of Mark Seaby, who was traded the previous season. Having started the season as the favourite for the AFL Rising Star, Naitanui finished 5th overall. In the 2011 season, he played 23 games, including his first finals matches, and was also nominated for Mark of the Year. He was named in the All-Australian team the following season, as the first-choice ruckman.

Early life
Along with his twin brother, Mark, Naitanui was born to Bola and Atetha Naitanui on 4 May 1990 in Penrith, New South Wales. His parents, originally from Suvavou, a small village near Suva, had emigrated to Australia from Fiji the previous year, with his two elder siblings, Georgie and Laisani, remaining in Fiji. His father died from cancer the year after Naitanui and his brother were born. After his father's death, his mother moved the family to Perth, Western Australia, where her brother lived. His mother began working at Homeswest, a public housing authority, and also volunteered at a homeless shelter. Naitanui grew up in Midvale, near Midland, and attended Midvale Primary School. He took up playing football at the age of nine, when he began playing for the Midvale Junior Football Club. As a child, he lived on Bushby Street in Midvale, along with Shane Yarran, Michael Walters and Chris Yarran, who would all go on to play AFL football. Two other AFL players, David Ellard and Jeff Garlett, also played with Naitanui, Walters, Chris Yarran and Shane Yarran at the Midvale Junior Football Club.

Naitanui attended Governor Stirling Senior High School and played football there, as well as for the Swan Districts Colts (underage) side in the West Australian Football League (WAFL). During his time in junior and colts football, he played predominantly in the ruck, however he also was used on the wing or at full-back. Naitanui also excelled at basketball and track and field events, particularly high jump, and was asked by recruiters to trial with American universities, but declined to do so.

In the 2007 Under-18 AFL National Championships, Naitanui was dominant in the ruck for Western Australia, and was named Best on Ground in the final.  Following his performance, he was hotly pursued by several AFL clubs. However, he was born a few days too late to qualify for the 2007 AFL draft. He was named in the Under-18 All-Australian Team in both 2007 and 2008, and was awarded a scholarship with the Australian Institute of Sport to become a member of the AIS/AFL Academy Squad.

A much-hyped Naitanui was invited to the 2008 AFL Draft Camp and his results were impressive. He managed to equal the running vertical jump record previously set by Jared Brennan, but fell short of Trent Croad's standing jump record. His sprint, agility and endurance tests were also impressive.

Many media commentators believed that Naitanui was in contention to be taken as the number 1 pick in the 2008 AFL Draft. The Melbourne Football Club, who retained that pick, had looked at Naitanui, but raised concerns about his skill level, in particular his kicking, and instead selected Victorian Jack Watts.

AFL career

2009–2015: Early career 
Naitanui was taken at pick No. 2 overall in the 2008 AFL Draft by the West Coast Eagles. As a highly rated future player by John Worsfold, Naitanui was given the number 9 guernsey, becoming the first West Coast Eagles player to wear the number since Brownlow Medalist and former captain Ben Cousins left the club at the end of the 2007 season.  His first game at the senior level was on 13 June 2009 when he was named to play against Richmond in game 12 of the 2009 season.

His career suffered a setback, however, during pre-season training when he experienced knee soreness and had precautionary surgery.

Naitanui impressed enough in the WAFL in a game where he accumulated 15 possessions, 21 hit-outs, 4 goals and a spectacular mark, to earn his selection in the round 12 against Richmond at Etihad Stadium.

His debut game impressed many, demonstrating his athletic ability with another spectacular mark as well as 3 kicks, 8 handballs, 3 marks and 7 hitouts. In his second game against premiers Hawthorn at Subiaco, Naitanui was quiet for the first three-quarters but dazzled in the fourth, kicking three goals and leading his team to a come-from-behind win.

Naitanui was honoured with a nomination for the AFL Rising Star in round 4, 2010 in the West Coast Eagles win over the Essendon Bombers, a match where Naitanui dominated with 13 disposals, 5 tackles and 17 hitouts. Naitanui took out the West Coast's Rookie of the Year Award for the 2010 Season and finished fifth in the 2010 Club Champion Award.

In March 2012, a viral video of Naitanui performing a slam dunk at a Perth Wildcats basketball game received over 100,000 views on YouTube.

On 17 September 2012 Naitanui earned his first All Australian Team nomination being named as the starting Ruckman.

On the Friday Night game against North Melbourne in round 8, 2013, Naitanui took a memorable pack mark 30m out with seconds left on the clock. He proceeded to kick a goal after the siren to win the game by 2 points, becoming the 35th AFL player to do so.

Naitanui played his 100th AFL game in round 13, 2014, against the Gold Coast Suns. West Coast won by three points.

2016–2018: ACL ruptures 
In round 21, during the 2016 season, Naitanui kicked a goal with 4 seconds remaining against the GWS Giants, winning the game for the Eagles. He ruptured his ACL in the following game, and missed the rest of the 2016 season.

Naitanui missed the entire 2017 season. Naitanui was in contention to play his first game for the season in the first semi-final against , but did not play.

During the 2018 season, Naitanui was suspended for a week following a tackle on Port Adelaide's Karl Amon. The decision was heavily criticised by the AFL media and past players where it was believed he was punished for being the stronger player in the tackle.

In round 17 of the 2018 season, after 15 games back from an injury to his left anterior cruciate ligament, Naitanui landed awkwardly in a contest just before half time of the match against the Collingwood Magpies, suffering the same injury to his right anterior cruciate ligament. He was expected to miss 10–12 months of football after a reconstruction. West Coast went on to win the 2018 AFL premiership in his absence.

2019 Comeback
After nearly a year out of the game, Naitanui returned to AFL football in round 15 against Hawthorn, after playing just one game with limited match time for the WAFL Eagles team.

2020-2021
Since the COVID-19 pandemic put a hold at the start of the season, Naitanui had his first full season in 4 years and received all-Australian honours as starting ruckman. On 19 October 2020, Naitanui received his first John Worsfold medal as the clubs best and fairest. At the end of 2021 he won the John Worsfold medal for best and fairest. He also made the All-Australian team on the bench.

Statistics
 Statistics are correct to the end of the 2021 season

|- style="background-color: #EAEAEA"
| 2009
| 
| 9 || 10 || 3 || 3 || 15 || 83 || 98 || 10 || 39 || 152 || 0.3 || 0.3 || 1.5 || 8.3 || 9.8 || 1.0 || 3.9 || 15.2
|-
| 2010
| 
| 9 || 22 || 9 || 9 || 94 || 163 || 257 || 31 || 74 || 366 || 0.4 || 0.4 || 4.3 || 7.4 || 11.7 || 1.4 || 3.4 || 16.6
|- style="background-color: #EAEAEA"
| 2011
| 
| 9 || 23 || 18 || 10 || 120 || 179 || 299 || 50 || 88 || 457 || 0.8 || 0.4 || 5.2 || 7.8 || 13.0 || 2.2 || 3.8 || 19.9
|-
| 2012
| 
| 9 || 22 || 24 || 14 || 116 || 171 || 287 || 66 || 75 || 543 || 1.1 || 0.6 || 5.3 || 7.8 || 13.0 || 3.0 || 3.4 || 24.7
|- style="background-color: #EAEAEA"
| 2013
| 
| 9 || 11 || 8 || 3 || 56 || 71 || 127 || 25 || 39 || 279 || 0.7 || 0.3 || 5.1 || 6.5 || 11.5 || 2.3 || 3.5 || 25.4
|-
| 2014
| 
| 9 || 20 || 9 || 7 || 85 || 164 || 249 || 31 || 77 || 438 || 0.5 || 0.4 || 4.3 || 8.2 || 12.5 || 1.6 || 3.9 || 21.9
|- style="background-color: #EAEAEA"
| 2015
| 
|| 9 || 23 || 17 || 13 || 132 || 136 || 268 || 33 || 82 || 782 || 0.7 || 0.6 || 5.7 || 6.0 || 11.7 || 1.4 || 3.6 || 34.0
|-
| 2016
| 
| 9 || 15 || 8 || 3 || 81 || 106 || 187 || 35 || 42 || 517 || 0.5 || 0.2 || 5.4 || 7.0 || 12.5 || 2.3 || 2.8 || 34.5
|- style="background-color: #EAEAEA"
| 2017
| 
|| 9 || 0 || — || — || — || — || — || — || — || — || — || — || — || — || — || — || — || —
|-
| 2018
| 
| 9 || 15 || 6 || 5 || 82 || 81 || 163 || 25 || 64 || 459 || 0.4 || 0.3 || 5.5 || 5.4 || 10.9 || 1.7 || 4.3 || 30.6
|- style="background-color: #EAEAEA"
| 2019
| 
|| 9 || 5 || 0 || 2 || 37 || 25 || 62 || 7 || 17 || 146 || 0.0 || 0.4 || 7.4 || 5.0 || 12.4 || 1.4 || 3.4 || 29.2
|- class="sortbottom"
| 2020
| 
|| 9 || 17 || 5 || 4 || 109 || 83 || 192 || 13 || 40 || 496 || 0.3 || 0.2 || 6.4 || 4.9 || 11.3 || 0.8 || 2.4 || 29.2
|-
|- style="background-color: #EAEAEA"
| 2021
| 
|| 9 || 22 || 3 || 5 || 154 || 181 || 335 || 34 || 65 || 687 || 0.1 || 0.3 || 7.0 || 8.2 || 15.2 || 1.6 || 3.0 || 31.2
|- class="sortbottom"
! colspan=3| Career
! 205 
! 110 
! 80 
! 1081 
! 1443 
! 2524 
! 360 
! 702 
! 5322 
! 0.5 
! 0.4 
! 5.3 
! 7.0 
! 12.3 
! 1.8 
! 3.4 
! 26.0 
|}

References

External links

Nic Naitanui player profile page at WAFL FootyFacts

1990 births
All-Australians (AFL)
Australian people of I-Taukei Fijian descent
People educated at Governor Stirling Senior High School
Swan Districts Football Club players
Australian twins
Twin sportspeople
West Coast Eagles players
Living people
People from Rewa Province
Australia international rules football team players
Australian rules footballers from Sydney
Australian rules footballers from Perth, Western Australia
West Coast Eagles (WAFL) players